Storm 2 (commonly known as Storm II) is a robot that competed in the British television game show Robot Wars. It was a small invertible box-shaped robot with a wedge on the front. The robot was originally built with no weapons but the team was asked to add an active weapon in order to take part in the seventh series, so the team came up with a built-in lifting arm, very similar to the American robot BioHazard. However, it was not the weapon but the immense speed and power of the robot that did the most damage to its opponents, managing to throw The Steel Avenger out of the Arena in its Series 7 heat final. The robot competed in the seventh series of Robot Wars, winning The Third World Championship at the end of the series, having won the 16th seed into the competition by being victorious in the New Blood Championship of Extreme 2.

Storm 2 was created by Ed Hoppitt. Tim Bence and Andrew Rayner joined him. Hoppitt and Bence would alternate driving during the wars. Not long after the filming of New Blood, Andrew Rayner got married, moved house, and began a family, so Bence's fiance, Meral Kolac, filled his place on the team.

Storm 2 was somewhat notable in the original run because it was the most prominent robot never to lose a battle through KO, only losing one battle on a controversial judge's decision. The said decision was the grand final of Series 7, losing the title to Typhoon 2. However, it lost on knockout to Apollo (who went on to win the series) in the heat final of the 2016 series after being thrown out of the arena, having lost to the same bot on judges decision in the group stages - in both fixtures, Apollo flipped over at least one house robot. Storm 2 was eligible to be named as a wildcard but was not chosen.

Like many other robots, Storm 2 also competed in Techno Games as Ickle Toaster in the Football and Sumo events. The original Storm was never seen in Robot Wars but competed in various robot combat events across the UK and the Dutch Robot Games.

When it was involved on the 2016 series of Robot Wars, the robot cost £20,000 and used Telemetry systems, thermistors, bespoke PMDC motors, and dry ice systems to prevent overheating.

Extreme Series 2

New Blood competition

Series 7

The Third World Championship

2016 Series

Series record
Series 1-6: Did not enter
Series 7: Second place

Robot honours
Extreme Series 2
New Blood Champion

Series 7
Grand-final-Second place

Series 7
Third Robot Wars World Champion

References

External links
Team Storm Website
Controversy fights
Storm 2 vs Firestorm
Storm 2 vs Supernova
Storm 2 vs Typhoon 2
 Storm 2 vs Tornado

Robot Wars (TV series) competitors
Robots of the United Kingdom
Rolling robots